Vizhithiru is a 2017 Indian Tamil-language action thriller film written and directed by Meera Kathiravan, who debuted with Aval Peyar Thamizharasi. The film which began production in 2012 after numerous delays released in 2017. The film stars Krishna, Vidharth, Dhansika, and Venkat Prabhu.

Cast

 Kreshna as Muthukumar
 Vidharth as Chandra Babu
 Sai Dhanshika as Saroja Devi
 Venkat Prabhu as Dhileepan
 Rahul Bhaskaran as Vikram 
 Thambi Ramaiah 
 S. P. B. Charan as Saravanan, news reporter
 Nagendra Babu as Police Commissioner 
 Abhinaya as Radio City RJ
 Erica Fernandes as Krishteena
 Sudha Chandran as Vijayalakshmi
 Sara Arjun as Charu
 Ramachandran Durairaj
 Arun Mozhi Manikkam in a guest appearance
 T. Rajendar in a special appearance
 Sudhar in an uncredited role

Production
The film has Krishna playing the lead, with Venkat Prabhu, Dhansika, Vidharth, Abhinaya, Deiva Thirumagal Sara Arjun, Thambi Ramaiah, Nagendra Babu (brother of Chiranjeevi) and new faces Rahul Bhaskaran and Erica Fernandes in important roles. Playback singer Sathyan Mahalingam made his debut as a music composer, and Vijay Milton will handle the cinematography, Praveen K. L. and N. B. Srikanth have been hired as editors. The film's first look photo shoot took place recently. Set in Chennai, the film happens within 12 hours. It was shot completely around Ritchie Street, Mount Road and Vepery.

Soundtrack
It was first reported that talks were on with Yuvan Shankar Raja to compose music, but singer Sathyan Mahalingam was finalized as the composer.
Papparappa - T. Rajender, Priyadarshini
Aazhi Alai (female) - Vaikom Vijayalakshmi
Aazhi Alai (male) - Alphons Joseph
Kolai Vaal - Vijay, Sricharan
Vellai Irave - G. V. Prakash, Ramya NSK
Pon Vidhi - Santhosh Narayanan

Critical reception
Behindwoods wrote "Vizhithiru has a decent script, but lacked execution". Times of India wrote "A not-so-bad message towards the end and the writing in some sequences make the film a tolerable watch". Sify wrote "Vizhithiru's core story has the potential of a classic thriller, the characters too are interestingly written but what works against the movie is the flat execution".

References

External links
 

2017 films
Indian action thriller films
2017 action thriller films
2010s Tamil-language films
Films set in Chennai
Films shot in Chennai
Indian nonlinear narrative films
Films scored by Sathyan